The Larcom Baronetcy was a title in the Baronetage of the United Kingdom. It was created on 24 December 1868 for Major-General Thomas Larcom. He was Under-Secretary for Ireland from 1853 to 1868. The second baronet was a lieutenant-colonel in the army and served in the New Zealand Wars from 1863 to 1864. The title became extinct on the death of the fifth baronet in 2004.

Larcom baronets (1868)
Sir Thomas Aiskew Larcom, 1st Baronet (1801–1879)
Sir Charles Larcom, 2nd Baronet (1843–1892)
Sir Thomas Perceval Larcom, 3rd Baronet (1882–1950)
Sir Philip Larcom, 4th Baronet (1887–1967)
Sir (Charles) Christopher Royde Larcom, 5th Baronet (1926–2004)

Arms

Notes

References
Kidd, Charles, Williamson, David (editors). Debrett's Peerage and Baronetage (1990 edition). New York: St Martin's Press, 1990, 

Extinct baronetcies in the Baronetage of the United Kingdom